Eugene Swen (born 18 November 1999) is a Liberian professional footballer who plays for Up Country Lions in Sri Lanka.

References

External links 
 
 

1999 births
Living people
Liberian footballers
Liberian expatriate footballers
Liberia international footballers
Expatriate footballers in Belarus
Expatriate footballers in Sri Lanka
Association football defenders
Barrack Young Controllers FC players
FC Energetik-BGU Minsk players
Place of birth missing (living people)